LoginRadius Inc. is a cloud-based SaaS Consumer Identity and Access Management platform based in San Francisco, California, USA. It was established in 2012.

The company was ranked as an Overall Leader by KuppingerCole analyst firm in the KuppingerCole Report Leadership Compass, 2020.

History
LoginRadius was started in 2012 by two friends Deepak Gupta and Rakesh Soni as a social login widget. In an interview, Soni said the duo started the company after recognizing the hassles of registration on websites and their negative effects of conversion rates.

Products 
In July 2020, LoginRadius launched the latest Identity Import Manager feature, which allows large-scale imports into the LoginRadius database of user profile data and credentials from another system using CSV files. The data is easily imported from different programs, facilities, and repositories.

Platform
According to the company, the LoginRadius platform has 200 pre-built integrations for different customer relationship management, ad platform, and email marketing tools. The platform is involved in the collection of customer data through traditional email based registration and through social profile data. Acquired customer data is secured in a cloud based storage. LoginRadius also provides a Single Customer View with customer data aggregated to one record. Organizations using the LoginRadius platform can integrate it with marketing tools.

References

External links
 
 loginhubs its complete login database
 Social login

Companies based in Vancouver
Federated identity
Identity management systems
Cloud applications
Password authentication
Cloud computing
Software companies of Canada